Giorgio Agliani (1910–1996) was an Italian film producer. A former Italian Resistance member he got his start in film production through his involvement with the ANPI-backed neorealist films The Sun Still Rises (1946) and Tragic Hunt (1947). Many of his later films were produced in the Sword-and-sandal epic genre.

Selected filmography
 The Sun Still Rises (1946)
 Tragic Hunt (1947)
 Women Without Names (1950)
 Abbiamo vinto! (1951)
 Attention! Bandits! (1951)
 Three Girls from Rome (1952)
 It Happened in the Park (1953)
 High School (1954)
 The Most Wonderful Moment (1957)
 First Love (1959)
 Minotaur, the Wild Beast of Crete (1960)
 Gladiator of Rome (1962)
 Goliath and the Rebel Slave(1963)
 Beatrice Cenci (1969)

References

Bibliography 
 Kinnard, Roy & Crnkovich, Tony . Italian Sword and Sandal Films, 1908–1990. McFarland, 2017.
 Vitti, Antonio. Giuseppe De Santis and Postwar Italian Cinema. University of Toronto Press, 1996.

External links 
 

1910 births
1996 deaths
Italian film producers
Film people from Milan